Puget Sound on the Pacific Coast is an 1870 oil landscape painting by the Hudson River School artist Albert Bierstadt. At the time of the work's completion, Bierstadt had not yet traveled to what was then Washington Territory. The work, commissioned by China trade merchant Abiel Abbot Low, was painted solely by written description of the Sound.

References

Paintings by Albert Bierstadt
1870 paintings
Water in art